The Tobacco Master Settlement Agreement (MSA) with Alabama is the particular version of the Tobacco MSA that was signed by Alabama, enabled by means of legislation in Alabama, and has been interpreted since then in Alabama courts.

The MSA contained incentives to the Settling States to enact statutes which would require Non-Participating Tobacco Product Manufacturers (NPMs) to place money in escrow each year based on their market shares, such money to be held to settle or pay judgments in possible future lawsuits against them. Arkansas enacted such a law, codified at A.C.A. § 26-57-260 and 261, and referred to as the Escrow Statute. As originally enacted, A.C.A. § 26-57-261 provided, in relevant part, as follows:

Any tobacco product manufacturer selling cigarettes to consumers within the state . . . after the date of enactment of this section, shall do one (1) of the following:
(1) Become a participating manufacturer, as that term is defined in section II(jj) of the Master settlement agreement, and generally perform its financial obligations under the Master settlement agreement; or
(2)
(A) Place into a qualified escrow fund by April 15 of the year following the year in question the following amounts. . . .
(B) A tobacco product manufacturer that places funds into escrow pursuant to subdivision (a) (2) (A) of this section [**8] shall receive the interest or other appreciation on such funds as earned. Such funds themselves shall be released from escrow only under the following circumstances:
(i) To pay a judgment or settlement on any released claim brought against such tobacco product manufacturer. . . .
(ii) To the extent that a tobacco manufacturer establishes that the amount it was required to place into escrow in a particular year was greater than the State's allocable share of the total payments that such manufacturer would have been required to make in that year under the Master settlement agreement, as determined pursuant to section IX(i)(2) of the Master settlement agreement and before any of the adjustments or offsets described in section IX(i) (3) of that agreement other than the inflation adjustment, had it been a participating manufacturer, the excess shall be released from escrow and revert to such tobacco product manufacturer.
(iii) To the extent not released from escrow under subdivisions (a) (2) (A) (i) or (a) (2) (A) (ii) of this section, funds shall be released from escrow and revert to such tobacco product manufacturer twenty-five (25) years after the date on which [**9] they were placed into escrow.

A.C.A. § 26-57-261(a)(2)(B)(ii) was known as the "Allocable Share Refund" provision. It insured that an NPM would not pay more, under the Escrow Statute, than the amount Arkansas would have received from the manufacturer if it had been a PM.

In February 2005, the Arkansas General Assembly amended the Allocable Share Refund provision by Act 384 of 2005. The amended provision (the "Allocable Share Amendment"), is codified at § 26-57-261(a)(2)(B)(ii), and provides as follows:
To the extent that a tobacco product manufacturer establishes that the amount it was required to place into escrow on account of units sold in the state in a particular year was greater than the Master settlement agreement payments, as determined under section IX(i) of the Master settlement agreement including after final determination of all adjustments, that the manufacturer would have been required to make on account of the units sold had it been a participating manufacturer, the excess shall be released from escrow and revert to such tobacco product manufacturer. . . .

Tobacco control
Alabama law
Smoking in the United States
Health in Alabama